James Patrick Blackden Marriott (6 September 1972 – 28 July 2012) was an English film critic and writer of fiction and non-fiction.

Marriott was educated at Rokeby Preparatory School and Wellington College, Berkshire. A graduate of the University of Manchester, he completed an MA in Film Studies at University of Exeter in 2010. His main interest was horror film, although his work included short stories and true crime fiction.

His book, Horror: the Definitive Guide to the Cinema of Fear (published by André Deutsch, 2006), and co-written with Kim Newman, was described by the London Review of Books, as "an extremely engaging and intelligent guide to horror film… informative, opinionated and down-right interesting to read." As a proof-reader and editor, he worked with Random House, Simon & Schuster and Virgin Books.

He began working as a library assistant at Bristol University's Arts and Social Sciences Library in October 2003. He advanced to hold Senior Library Assistant duties in the Continuing Education Library and in the library relegation team, and provided support in Special Collections.

Death
He died on 28 July 2012, aged 39, from undisclosed causes.

Bibliography (non-fiction)
Horror!: 333 Films to Scare You to Death, Carlton Books, 2010; 
Horror Films, Virgin Books, 2007;  (under pen name "Patrick Blackden") 
Holidaymakers from Hell: Shocking Behaviour by Tourists Abroad, Virgin Books, 2004; 
Tourist Trap, Virgin Books, 2003; 
Danger Down Under, Virgin Books, 2002; 
My Bloody Valentine : Couples Whose Sick Crimes Shocked the World, Virgin Books, 2002;

References

1972 births
2012 deaths
21st-century English writers
Alumni of the University of Exeter
Alumni of the University of Manchester
English book editors
English film critics
English librarians
English non-fiction writers
English short story writers
People associated with the University of Bristol
Place of birth missing
Place of death missing
English male short story writers
21st-century British short story writers
21st-century English male writers
English male non-fiction writers